Elixane Lechemia (born 3 September 1991) is a French tennis player.

She has career-high WTA rankings of No. 343 in singles, achieved on 3 April 2017, and of No. 65 in doubles, set on 7 March 2022. Lechemia has won one doubles title on the WTA Tour with four singles and 14 doubles titles on the ITF Women's Circuit.

Professional career

2019-20: Grand Slam debut
Lechemia made her Grand Slam main-draw debut at the 2019 French Open, after receiving a wildcard for the doubles draw, partnering Estelle Cascino. She participated also in the 2020 French Open as a wildcard, partnering with debutante French teenager Elsa Jacquemot.

2021: First WTA doubles title, top-100 debut in doubles
In April 2021, she won her first WTA Tour title at the Copa Colsanitas in Bogotá, partnering with American Ingrid Neel, defeating the third-seeded pair of Mihaela Buzărnescu and Anna-Lena Friedsam.

She participated for the third consecutive year in the French Open as a wildcard, partnering again with Elsa Jacquemot.

Grand Slam doubles performance timeline

WTA career finals

Doubles: 1 (1 title)

WTA Challenger finals

Doubles: 1 (runner-up)

ITF Circuit finals

Singles: 9 (4 titles, 5 runner–ups)

Doubles: 29 (15 titles, 14 runner–ups)

References

External links
 
 

1991 births
Living people
French female tennis players
Tennis players from Lyon